Nicolas Pallois (born 19 September 1987) is a French professional footballer who plays as a defender  and captains Ligue 1 side Nantes. He has previously played for Quevilly, Valenciennes, Laval, Chamois Niortais, and Bordeaux.

Career
Pallois started his career with Caen but failed to make an appearance for the club before moving to Championnat de France amateur side Quevilly in 2008. During his two years with Quevilly, he played 53 league matches scoring three goals. In May 2010, Pallois joined Ligue 1 club Valenciennes on a three-year contract. He made his professional debut during the 2010–11 season with Valenciennes and went on to play 11 times for the club, before moving on loan to Laval for the 2011–12 season.

On 28 June 2012, Pallois signed a two-year deal with newly promoted Ligue 2 side Chamois Niortais. He went on to make 71 league appearances for Niort over the following two seasons, scoring four goals.

On 17 June 2014, he signed a four-year contract with Bordeaux.

In late July 2017, Pallois moved Ligue 1 rivals Nantes, agreeing to a three-year deal with the option of a fourth year. The transfer fee paid to Bordeaux was reported as close to €2 million.

Honours
Nantes
Coupe de France: 2021–22

References

External links
 
 
 
 

1987 births
Living people
People from Elbeuf
Sportspeople from Seine-Maritime
French footballers
Association football defenders
Stade Malherbe Caen players
US Quevilly-Rouen Métropole players
Valenciennes FC players
Stade Lavallois players
Chamois Niortais F.C. players
FC Girondins de Bordeaux players
FC Nantes players
Ligue 1 players
Ligue 2 players
Championnat National 2 players
Footballers from Normandy